Kileh Sepyan (also Romanized as Kīleh Sepyān; also known as Keleh Sepyān) is a village in Lahijan-e Sharqi Rural District, Lajan District, Piranshahr County, West Azerbaijan Province, Iran. At the 2006 census, its population was 319, in 43 families.

References 

Populated places in Piranshahr County